The Andalusian Party (PA) was an Andalusian nationalist centre-left political party from Andalusia (Spain), with an important presence in provinces such as Cádiz and Seville although in the past they have stood in other provinces and even won seats in Barcelona to the Parliament of Catalonia.

History
The party was founded as the Socialist Alliance of Andalusia in 1965 by Alejandro Rojas-Marcos. In 1976 it took the name Socialist Party of Andalusia. In 1979 the name was changed to Socialist Party of Andalusia - Andalusian Party. The PA party name was adopted in 1984. Its last Secretary-General was Antonio Jesús Ruiz.

A splinter group, led by former leader Pedro Pacheco, was formed in 2001, under the name Socialist Party of Andalusia, later rejoined Partido Andalucista.

Historically, the party had been strong in the capital city of Andalusia, Seville, as well as other big cities like Jerez de la Frontera or Algeciras, obtaining the cities' mayorship in several times in all three cities. At their 17th Congress on 12 September 2015, the party dissolved.

Ideology
The Andalusian Party declared itself ideologically as an Andalusian, federalist and progressive nationalist political organization. Its main motivation is the extension and maintenance of Andalusian autonomy, fighting against a "conformist attitude" and defending the cultural identity of Andalusia.

The PA declared itself as a political organization that defended the interests of the Andalusian people and sought to obtain equality before other peoples of Spain. This means that from the PA they considered Andalusia as a nation with its own cultural identity, a condition that has been accommodated until today in article 2 of the Spanish Constitution of 1978, and which was conquered as in no other Spanish territory, starting from the ratification of autonomy and the Statute in a referendum. Therefore, they defended this political and legal fact in those institutions and organizations in which they were present.

The PA also declared itself as a progressive organization, referring only to an option committed to an autonomous and sustainable socio-economic development of Andalusia, innovative and empowered to generate initiatives, and in this way, overcome the territorial and social imbalances within and dependency and inequality with respect to other peoples, rejecting the current role assigned to the autonomous community as a provider of resources and low-skilled labor.

The PA was called federalist, because it supported a model of political organization that surpassed the State of the Autonomies and that advanced towards a federal State in Spain.

It declared itself, finally, of the left, when it declared that there was an indisputable priority for the construction of a more just and egalitarian society, open and tolerant, peaceful and supportive, that guarantees the conservation of the cultural and natural heritage that identifies the community so that be enjoyed by the next generations, as well as a level and quality of life that allows maximum happiness and well-being to the Andalusian people.

See also
 Andalucista Youth, the party's youth wing
 Andalusian nationalism

References

External links
Partido Andalucista Official website 
Grupo Parlamentario Andalucista Website of PA representatives 

1965 establishments in Andalusia
2015 disestablishments in Andalusia
Andalusian nationalist parties
Defunct nationalist parties in Spain
Defunct social democratic parties in Spain
European Free Alliance
Political parties established in 1965
Political parties disestablished in 2015
Political parties in Andalusia
Left-wing nationalist parties